Pterosaur Beach is the name that paleontologists have given to an area along a long gone lagoon in what is now southwestern France. The area is notable because it is the first time that the fossil footprints of a landing pterosaur have been discovered. The fossil footprints are approximately 140 million years old.

The site has hundreds of fossilized pterosaur trackways.

The discovery was made by Jean-Michel Mazin from the University of Lyon.

References

External links
First record of a pterosaur landing trackway, by Jean-Michel Mazin, Jean-Paul Billon-Bruyat, and Kevin Padian, Proceedings of the Royal Society B: Biological Sciences, 2009

Pterosaurs